Sitalcina borregoensis is a species of armoured harvestman in the family Phalangodidae. It is found in North America.

References

 Ubick, Darrell, and Thomas S. Briggs (1989). "The harvestman family Phalangodidae. 1. The new genus Calicina, with notes on Sitalcina (Opiliones: Laniatores)". Proceedings of the California Academy of Sciences, vol. 46, no. 4, 95-136.

Harvestmen
Animals described in 1968